Century Tower is a residential apartment building in Sydney, New South Wales, Australia. It is located on 343–357 Pitt Street right between Wilmot Street and Central Street in Sydney CBD.

In 1998 a lightning rod was added to the top of the building.

See also
Skyscrapers in Sydney

External links
Official Century Tower Website
Emporis.com

Skyscrapers in Sydney
Residential buildings completed in 1997
Residential skyscrapers in Australia
Apartment buildings in Sydney
Sydney central business district